The Oneida Cotton Mills and Scott-Mebane Manufacturing Company Complex, also known as the Scott and Donnell Mill, is a historic hosiery mill building in Graham, Alamance County, North Carolina. It consists of four contributing buildings and one contributing structure. The buildings date from 1882 into the 1940s; all are red-brick except for a small shed-roofed bathroom building from the 1940s. The complex includes the Scott and Donnell Mill (1882, c. 1959), a smokestack (1882), Holt Mill (c. 1898; c. 1959), Scott-Mebane Manufacturing Company (c. 1900; c. 1906; c. 1959), and opener Room (c. 1931).

It was added to the National Register of Historic Places in 2014.

References

Industrial buildings and structures on the National Register of Historic Places in North Carolina
Industrial buildings completed in 1882
National Register of Historic Places in Alamance County, North Carolina
Textile mills in North Carolina
1882 establishments in North Carolina